Igors Šaplavskis (born 21 January 1968) is a Latvian boxer. He competed in the men's light middleweight event at the 1992 Summer Olympics.

References

External links
 

1968 births
Living people
Latvian male boxers
Olympic boxers of Latvia
Boxers at the 1992 Summer Olympics
Sportspeople from Jelgava
Light-middleweight boxers